Curran may refer to:

People
 Curran (surname)
 Curran Oi (born 1990), an American figure skater

Material
 Curran (material)

Places
Curran, community in Alfred and Plantagenet, Ontario, Canada
Northern Ireland
Curran, County Londonderry
United States
Curran, Illinois
Curran, Michigan
Curran, Wisconsin, a town
Curran, Kewaunee County, Wisconsin, an unincorporated community
Curran Township, Sangamon County, Illinois

See also
Curan, a commune in southern France
Currans, a village in County Kerry, Ireland
Curren (disambiguation)
Corran (disambiguation), places in Scotland
Coran (disambiguation)